The Zimbabwe cricket team made their first tour of Sri Lanka in September 1996, playing two Test Matches. Sri Lanka won the Test series 2-0:
 1st Test @ R Premadasa Stadium, Colombo – Sri Lanka won by an innings and 77 runs
 2nd Test @ Sinhalese Sports Club Ground, Colombo – Sri Lanka won by 10 wickets

Test series

1st Test

2nd Test

References

External links
 Tour home at ESPNcricinfo

1996 in Zimbabwean cricket
1996 in Sri Lankan cricket
Zimbabwean cricket tours of Sri Lanka
International cricket competitions from 1994–95 to 1997
Sri Lankan cricket seasons from 1972–73 to 1999–2000